Images of Heaven is the second EP by Peter Godwin. The EP was released in 1982.

Track listing
All songs written by Peter Godwin except where noted.
 "Emotional Disguise" — 4:12
 "Images of Heaven" — 5:35
 "Torch Songs for the Heroine" — 4:01
 "French Emotions" — 2:32
 "Emotional Disguise" (Instrumental) — 4:14
 "Torch Songs for the Heroine" (Ballad) — 3:21

Covers
Eloquent (USA) covered "Images of Heaven" - 2012
Missing Persons covered "Images of Heaven on 'Dreaming'" - 2020

1982 EPs
Peter Godwin albums